Washington's 42nd legislative district is one of forty-nine districts in Washington state for representation in the state legislature.

The current state senator is Sharon Shewmake, who defeated Simon Sefzik who was appointed to the position by the Whatcom County Council. At a ceremony in Bellingham, Sen. Sharon Shewmake (D-Bellingham) was sworn into office by Judge Cecily Hazelrigg with family, friends, and supporters looking on.

Shewmake replaces Republican Sen. Simon Sefzik in the Senate, who was appointed to replace Sen. Doug Ericksen after Ericksen’s death in late 2021. Shewmake defeated Sefzik in the 2022 election, and was sworn in to fulfill the final weeks of what would have been Ericksen’s term, followed by a full four-year term starting in 2023. Shewmake previously served in the state House of Representatives.

In the Senate, Shewmake is slated to serve as Vice Chair of the Senate Transportation Committee, helping to set statewide transportation policy and budgets, as well as sit on the Senate Housing Committee and the Senate Agriculture, Water, Natural Resources & Parks Committee. The Senate is scheduled to vote to confirm all committee positions on Jan. 9, the first day of the 2023 legislative session.

“I’m honored by the trust the voters placed in me,” Shewmake said. “On the campaign trail this year, I had the opportunity to speak firsthand with thousands of our neighbors here in Whatcom County and to hear about the issues and concerns that folks have, so I know we have a lot of important work to do.”

Shewmake plans to focus on issues including housing affordability, flood response and recovery, and public safety, among other issues.

“I’m excited to dig in with my new colleagues here in the Senate,” Shewmake said. “From helping families with affordability of housing and energy, to creating jobs and building our infrastructure, to ensuring we can all live in safe communities, there’s a lot to be done. I will represent each and every one of my constituents with integrity, honesty and a commitment to solving problems with my colleagues — regardless of their party affiliation.”

Outside of her legislative service, Shewmake is a professor of environmental economics, urban economics and energy policy at Western Washington University in Bellingham, as well as a children’s book author, spouse, and mother of two young boys.

The district's state representatives are Alicia Rule (D; position 1), and Joe Timmons (D; position 2).

History of Senators

1889-1901 No district

1903 John Earles.................................................D

1907 Robert L. Kline ..........................................R

1911 Henry M. White .........................................D

1915 Edward J. Cleary........................................R

1919 Edward J. Cleary........................................R

1923 Edward J. Cleary........................................R

1927 Edward J. Cleary........................................R

1931 Edward J. Cleary........................................R

1935 S. C. Roland ...............................................D

1939 Thomas Voyce ...........................................D

1943 Harry A. Binzer (Entered military service) ........R

Ralph C. Tenney (Appointed February 15, 1944 to serve 1944 Ex. S.; Resigned 1945)...................R

Thomas R. Waters (Elected 1945 to serve unexpired term)...................................D

1947 Harry A. Binzer..........................................R

1951 Vaughan Brown .........................................D

1955 Homer O. Nunamaker ................................D

1959 Homer O. Nunamaker ............................... D

1963 R. Frank Atwood ....................................... R

1967 R. Frank Atwood ....................................... R

1971 R. Frank Atwood ....................................... R

1975 H. A. “Barney” Goltz ................................ D

1979 H. A. “Barney” Goltz ................................ D

1983 H. A. “Barney” Goltz ................................ D

1987 Ann Anderson............................................ R

1991 Ann Anderson............................................ R

1995 Ann Anderson (Resigned September 15, 1998; Appointed to Tax Appeals Board)...................... R

Joe Elenbaas (Appointed November 10, 1998).... R

1999 Georgia Gardner (Elected November 3, 1998; Sworn in Nov. 23, 1998 to serve unexpired term)... D

2003 Dale Brandland.......................................... R

2007 Dale Brandland.......................................... R

2011 Doug Ericksen ........................................... R

2015 Doug Ericksen ........................................... R

2019 Doug Ericksen ........................................... R

History of Representatives

G. E. DeSteiguer ........................................R

Edmond S. Meany......................................R

1893 Edmond S. Meany......................................R

L. H. Wheeler.............................................R

1895 Solon T. Williams ......................................R

R. B. Albertson ..........................................R

1897 Hans Hansen ......................................... Pop.

Solon T. Williams .......................Silver Rep.

1899 Charles S. Gleason .....................................R

L. W. Carpenter..........................................R

1901 R. B. Albertson (Speaker) .............................R

Frederick Burch .........................................R

1903 Edgar C. Raine ...........................................R

Dr. C. S. Emery..........................................R

1905 David McVay.............................................R

Gerhardt Ericksen ......................................R

1907 W. F. Freudenberg .....................................R

W. C. McMaster.........................................R

1909 W. C. McMaster.........................................R

Walter T. Christensen ................................R

1911 Walter T. Christensen................................ R

Edgar J. Wright.......................................... R

1913 Walter T. Christensen.......................... Prog.

Thomas F. Murphine ........................... Prog.

1915 Thomas F. Murphine ........................... Prog.

W. D. Lane .......................................... Prog.

1917 Frank E. Boyle........................................... R

Walter T. Christensen................................ R

1919 George N. Hodgdon................................... D

H. C. Bohlke.............................................. D

1921 Thomas F. Murphine ................................. R

George T. Ericksen.................................... R

1923 William Phelps Totten............................... R

Thomas F. Murphine ................................. R

1925 Elmer Ellsworth Shields ............................ R

William Phelps Totten............................... R

1927 Elmer Ellsworth Shields ............................ R

E. L. Howard ............................................. R

1929 William Phelps Totten............................... R

M. B. Mitchell ........................................... R

1931 M. B. Mitchell............................................R

E. L. Howard..............................................R

1933 Tim Healy ..................................................R

Charles I. Roth ...........................................R

1935 James D. McDonald...................................D

Thomas Voyce ...........................................D

1937 James D. McDonald...................................D

Thomas Voyce ...........................................D

1939 James D. McDonald...................................D

B. F. Reno, Jr. ............................................R

1941 B. F. Reno, Jr. ............................................R

Charles F. Trunkey.....................................R

1943 Homer O. Nunamaker ................................D

Percy Willoughby ......................................D

1945 Homer O. Nunamaker ................................D

Percy Willoughby ......................................D

1947 Leo C. Goodman........................................R

Leslie J. Peterson .......................................R

1949 Vaughan Brown .........................................D

Homer O. Nunamaker ................................D

1951 Marshall Forrest .........................................D

Homer O. Nunamaker ................................D

1953 Hal G. Arnason, Jr......................................R

Malcolm McBeath......................................R

1955 Hal G. Arnason, Jr......................................R

Malcolm McBeath......................................R

1957 George G. Dowd ........................................D

Richard J. “Dick” Kink ..............................D

1959 A. E. Edwards ............................................D

Richard J. “Dick” Kink ..............................D

1961 A. E. Edwards ............................................D

Richard J. “Dick” Kink ..............................D

1963 Richard J. “Dick” Kink ..............................D

Charles E. Lind ..........................................R

1965 Richard J. “Dick” Kink ..............................D

W. O. E. Radcliffe......................................D

1967 Dr. Caswell J. Farr .....................................R

Richard J. “Dick” Kink ..............................D

Fred A. Veroske .........................................R

1969 Dr. Caswell J. Farr .....................................R

Richard J. “Dick” Kink ..............................D

Fred A. Veroske .........................................R

1971 Dr. Caswell J. Farr .....................................R

Donald G. Hansey......................................R

Dan Van Dyk .............................................D

1973 H. A. “Barney” Goltz.................................D

Dan Van Dyk .............................................D

1975 Mary Kay Becker.......................................D

Art Moreau.................................................D

1977 Mary Kay Becker.......................................D

Art Moreau.................................................D

1979 Mary Kay Becker.......................................D

Roger Van Dyken.......................................R

1981 Mary Kay Becker ...................................... D

Roger Van Dyken...................................... R

1983 Dennis Braddock ....................................... D

Roger Van Dyken...................................... R

1985 Dennis Braddock ....................................... D

Pete Kremen .............................................. D

1987 Dennis Braddock ....................................... D

Pete Kremen .............................................. D

1989 Dennis Braddock ....................................... D

Pete Kremen .............................................. D

1991 Dennis Braddock ....................................... D

Pete Kremen .............................................. D

1993 Kelli Linville ............................................. D

Pete Kremen .............................................. D

1995 Gene Goldsmith......................................... R

Pete Kremen (Resigned December 9, 1995; Elected Whatcom County Executive).................. D

Kelli Linville (Appointed December 12, 1995 to serve unexpired term)...........................................D

1997 Georgia Anne Gardner .............................. D

Kelli Linville ............................................. D

1999 Doug Ericksen ........................................... R

Kelli Linville ............................................. D

2001 Doug Ericksen ........................................... R

Kelli Linville ............................................. D

2003 Doug Ericksen ........................................... R

Kelli Linville ............................................. D

2005 Doug Ericksen ........................................... R

Kelli Linville ............................................. D

2007 Doug Ericksen ........................................... R

Kelli Linville ............................................. D

2009 Doug Ericksen ........................................... R

Kelli Linville ............................................. D

2011 Jason Overstreet ........................................ R

Vincent Buys ............................................. R

2013 Jason Overstreet ........................................ R

Vincent Buys ............................................. R

2015 Luanne Van Werven.................................. R

Vincent Buys ............................................. R

2017 Luanne Van Werven.................................. R

Vincent Buys ............................................. R

2019 Luanne Van Werven.................................. R

Sharon Shewmake ..................................... D

See also
Washington Redistricting Commission
Washington State Legislature
Washington State Senate
Washington House of Representatives

References

http://leg.wa.gov/House/Pages/MembersByDistrict.aspx
https://leg.wa.gov/History/Legislative/Documents/MembersOfLeg2019.pdf

External links
Washington State Redistricting Commission
Washington House of Representatives
Map of Legislative Districts

42